Ishti Kutum is a Bengali TV serial that aired from 24 October 2011 to 13 December 2015 on Star Jalsha. It started telecasting everyday from 3 May 2015. The show was produced by Magic Moments Motion Pictures company. This is the first serial produced by Magic Moments Motion Pictures on Star Jalsha as well as the longest serial of Magic Moments Motion Pictures. The show went on-air on 24 October 2011. It starred Ranita Das (later replaced by Sudipta Chakraborty), Rishi Kaushik and Ankita Chakraborty in lead roles. After running for 4 years, Ishti Kutum went off-air on 13 December 2015.

In 2014, Ranita Das had to resign as Ishti Kutum for medical reasons. A legal issue also happened with Star Jalsha when she discontinued Ishti Kutum.

Plot
The story revolves around the life of an 18 year old tribal love-child Bahamoni Soren from a secluded region called Palashboni in rural West Bengal. Bahamoni (Baha), who had just completed her 10th standard upon scoring star marks and wants to attend college, is brought up by her mother Konkamoni (Konka) and stepfather Satyakam who is also a tribal activist and leader. Baha and her mother Konka had to face a lot of humiliation from her grandmother, who always yelled at her and Konka. Konka and Dibyo recalled their past when Dibyo came to Polashboni 20 years ago and had an affair but Dibyo eventually leaves Konka as Dibyo is married with a 7 year old daughter Kamalika/Mon. A famous journalist from the city of Kolkata, Archisman Mukherjee, visits Palashboni to interview Satyakam. Baha and Archi cross paths when Baha brings food and when the food falls down. One stormy night Baha was forced to spend the night in the Tourist Lodge in Archi's room. The next morning, the villagers decided to kill Archi, but Baha stopped it. Archi was in a difficult situation and to save his life, he was forced to marry Baha. Archi was having a tough time, thinking that how he will go to his family. On that day, Baha knew Archi has a fiancee in the city so she promises Archi that she will never talk about this forced ritual. Archi, who has a 7 year long love relationship with Kamalika, refuses to recognize the ceremony and asks Baha to decide what she wants to do. Baha then comes to Kolkata with Archi as a maidservant. She begins to study in the city. Gradually, she becomes comfortable and happy in the city, living with the Mukherjee family, who also begin to love her cheerful ways. Initially, Archi thinks of Baha as a nuisance. He continues his engagement to Kamalika Majumdar, a college professor, whose father Dibyojoti Majumdar, a painter, who also happens to be Baha's biological father. Archi marries Kamalika legally with ceremony and registration in the city as Baha also witnesses the same. But after 8 months of their marriage Archi started cheating on Kamalika with Baha. After knowing Baha is the secret love-child of Dibyo and Kanka, and she is also his wife Kamalika's half sister, Archi suddenly started feeling bad for Baha and wanted to have her close to him now. Baha who always wanted to be recognized by Archi secretly took this opportunity and started visiting Kamalika-Archi's bedroom when Kamalika was not present. Gradually Archi starts misbehaving with Kamalika, making her life sad and miserable. Baha secretly used to see this but went on as a secret affair inside Archi's house. An unhappy Kamalika tries to commit suicide when she realized she has been cheated by her husband and 8 year long trusting man. With such drastic step Kamalika's mother decides to file a case against Archi but Kamalika was still madly in love with him saves Archi's career, reputation, and jail-time by lying to everyone that she herself is not interested in this marriage. Kamalika eventually divorces Archi to free him from this marriage and arranges for his wedding to Baha even though Kamalika;s heart was broken everyday. Archi and Baha are married in the eyes of the law. Baha continues her studies and performs brilliantly. Kamalika forces her father Dibyojoyti to accept Baha as his daughter. Dibyojoti regrets his past behavior and tries to build a relationship with Baha. Meanwhile, Archi's elder brother, Dhritiman, returns home and is suffering from leukemia. He breaks off his engagement with Sanjhbati, a singer, because of his illness. With Baha's help, Dhritiman and Sanjhbati resolve their differences and marry. Archi grows jealous of Baha's intimacy with Prakash, her friend and professor, but later realises she is innocent and becomes possessive of her. Dhrubo Sen, a lawyer, falls in love with Kamalika. Kamalika takes his help in getting bail for Satyakam. Finding a good friend in Dhrubo, Kamalika agrees to marry him. But Dhrubo's first wife Rusha, who had run away and was missing for many years, suddenly returns leaving Kamalika shocked. Baha and Archi try to fight for Rusha, unaware of her criminal connections. Baha gets arrested as she lies to police and take a packet of drugs. Archi and Baha again breaks Kamalika's marriage by bringing Rusha in their life. Rusha returns to Dhrubo and Kamalika leaves him becoming lonely. As a result, Dibyojyoti disowns Baha as his daughter. Later on, Baha travels abroad for higher studies. Kamalika is pregnant with Dhruba's child but hides this from him. She meets Bikram who falls in love with her and accepts her unborn child. Meanwhile, Archi discovers that Bikram is his cousin brother. Kamalika finally decides to marry Bikram and gives birth to a son, Aasmaan. Rusha steals the baby who is rescued and returned to Kamalika by Bikram and Archi. After a long time, Baha returns in a new look. Baha unintentionally causes Archi's sister Nilu to miscarry. Archi threatens to divorce Baha. Kamalika sees Baha and her colleague on the street and informs Archi suspecting Baha is having an affair. An angry Baha threatens Kamalika with filing a case if she interferes between her and Archi. Archi reminds her of Kamalika's sacrifices that Archi would have been in jail and Baha would have had no life if Kamalika didnt show mercy on them while divorcing archi. Archi started moving away from Baha because of her behaviour and considered her a nuisance. Kamalika is diagnosed with a terminal disease. She goes to Palashboni and donates her money to build a hospital there. She dies in Archi's arms on her birthday and leaves her child in his care. Baha realizes no matter how much she tries Archi will never forget his first love Kamalika and leaves finally. Elsewhere, Mithai later marries Dibakar.

5 years later

Baha and Archi meet at a function and Archi talks about Kamalika's son who wants to see Baha. Baha decides to stay with him happily again and the serial ends.

Cast

Main
 Ranita Das as Bahamoni Mukherjee (née Soren/Majumdar) aka Baha – Konkamoni and Dibyo's daughter; Satyakam's adoptive daughter; Kamalika's half-sister; Archi's wife; Aasman's foster mother. (2011 – 2014)
Sudipta Chakraborty Replaced Ranita Das as Bahamoni Mukherjee (2014 – 2015)
Rishi Kaushik as Archisman Mukherjee aka Archi – A journalist; Polu and Parna's son; Mithai's brother; Kamalika's ex-husband; Baha's husband; Aasman's foster father. (2011 – 2015)
Ankita Chakraborty as Prof. Kamalika Mukherjee (née Majumdar) aka Mun – An Economics professor; Anu and Dibyo's daughter; Baha's half-sister; Archi and Dhruba's ex-wife; Bikram's wife; Aasman's mother. (Deceased) (2011 – 2015)

Recurring

Mukherjee family
Goutam De as Pallab Mukherjee aka Polu – Parna's husband; Mithai and Archi's father. (2011 – 2015)
Tanuka Chatterjee as Parnabai Mukherjee aka Parna – Polu's wife; Mithai and Archi's mother. (2011 – 2015)
Santu Mukherjee as Hiranmoy Mukherjee aka Hiru – Rani's husband; Nilu, Rupu and Dhriti's father (2011 – 2015)
Saswati Guha Thakurta as Radharani Mukherjee aka Rani – Hiru's wife; Nilu, Rupu and Dhriti's mother (2011 – 2015)
Arindam Sil as Debraj Mukherjee aka Debu – Doyel's ex-husband; Chini's father (N/A)
Manjusree Ganguly as Doyel Ghosh (née Pakhi) – Debu's ex-wife; Tamojit's wife; Chini's mother (2011 – 2015)
Surojit Banerjee as Tamojit Ghosh – A scientist; Doyel's second husband; Chini's adoptive father (2013 – 2015)
Badshah Moitra as Dhritiman Mukherjee aka Dhriti – Hiru and Rani's son; Nilu and Rupu's brother; Sanjhbati's husband (Deceased) (2012 – 2015)
Bidipta Chakraborty as Sanjhbati Mukherjee – A singer; Dhriti's widow (2012 – 2015)
Rupsha Guha as Nilanjana Banerjee (née Mukherjee) aka Nilu – Hiru and Rani's younger daughter; Rupu and Dhriti's sister; Prabuddha's wife
Sandip Chakraborty as Prabuddha Banerjee – Nilu's husband (2011; 2012 – 2015)
Sahana Sen as Rupanjana Chatterjee (née Mukherjee) aka Rupu – Hiru and Rani's elder daughter; Nilu and Dhriti's sister; Arjo's wife (2011 – 2015)
Suman Banerjee as Arjo Chatterjee – Rupu's husband (2012 – 2015)
Aishi Bhattacharya / Abantika Biswas as Chinmoyee Ghosh aka Chini – Doyel and Debu's daughter; Tamojit's adoptive daughter (2011 – 2015)
Sonal Mishra as Suranjana Ghosh (née Mukherjee) aka Mithai – Polu and Parna's daughter; Archi's sister; Prakash's ex-wife; Dibakar's wife (2011 – 2015)

Majumdar family
Shankar Chakraborty as Dibyajyoti Majumdar aka Dibyo – An aspiring painter; Ashapurna's son; Jaya's brother; Anu's husband; Kamalika and Baha's father (2011 – 2015)
Madhabi Mukhopadhyay as Ashapurna Majumdar – Dibyo and Jaya's mother; Kamalika and Baha's grandmother (2011 – 2015)
Rajasree Bhowmick as Jayasree Majumdar aka Jaya – Ashapurna's daughter; Dibyo's sister (2011 – 2015)
Suchismita Chowdhury as Anushree Majumdar aka Anu– Dibyo's wife; Kamalika's mother (2011 – 2015)

Hembram family
Anushree Das as Konkamoni Hembram (née Soren) – Satyakam's wife; Baha's mother; Prakash's adoptive mother. (2011 – 2015)
Chandan Sen as Satyakam Hembram – A tribal activist; Konkamoni's husband; Prakash's father; Baha's adoptive father (2011 – 2015)
Sudip Sengupta as Prakash Hembram – Satyakam's son; Baha's former love interest; Mithai's ex-husband (2011 – 2015)

Others
Bhaswar Chatterjee as Dhrubo Sen aka Piklu – A lawyer; Kamalika's ex-husband; Aasman's father (2012 – 2015)
Koushik Roy as Bikramjit Mukherjee aka Bikram – Archi and Mithai's cousin; Kamalika's husband (2014 – 2015)
Dipankar De as Babiya - Sanjhbati's uncle (2012)
Anuradha Roy as Sanjhbati's mother (2012)
Dola Chakraborty as Arjyo's mother (N/A)
Kunal Padhi as Arjyo's father (N/A)
Dwaipayan Das as Dibakar Ghosh – Mithai's second husband (2015)
Diganta Bagchi as Arghya Uncle (2012)
Koushani Roy as Rusha Sen – Dhrubo's first wife (2014 – 2015)
Dr. Basudeb Mukherjee as Jyotishmaan Sen – Dhrubo's father
Chaitali Dasgupta as Dhrubo's mother
Kalyani Mondal as Dhrubo's aunt
Sagarika Roy as Sokhimoni aka Sokhi – Baha's friend in Palashboni. (2011 – 2015)
Arup Roy as Monglu – Baha's friend (2012 – 2015)
Priyam Chakraborty as Monojaba / Dodul
Rita Koiral as Kumudini / Kumu
Sujata Daw as Mishti
Pushpendu Roy as Krishanu (2012)
Surjya Kar as Anjan
Satyam Majumder as a milkman (2012)
Sourav Chatterjee as Arjun
Sanchita Bhattacharya as Srimoyee
Sourav Chakraborty as Rusha's Boss
Arghya Mukherjee as an Inspector
Kamalika Banerjee as Sharmila (2015)
Suparna Patra as Baha's friend (2012 – 2015)
Pritha Roy as Baha's friend (2012 – 2015)

Guest appearance

 Prosenjit Chatterjee 
 Aryann Bhowmik
Srikanta Acharya

Soumitra Chatterjee

In popular cultures

Baha became a very popular character in the History of the Bengali television and it produced Baha Sindoor, Baha Chocolate, Baha Goyna, Baha Choti and Baha Saree which even went abroad.

Adaptations

Reception
This show has been controversial because of its poor and misleading content. This has also enraged the tribal community of West Bengal for hurting their sentiments and portraying tribal characters poorly. A lawsuit was filed by the tribal community in July 2014 in Kolkata High Court against the channel for portraying tribal women's characters in poor light as well as ridiculing their language and culture. Though the channel denied all charges, there was a  uproar from the audience towards the themes of cheating women, and domestic violence, provocation of suicide etc. by the lead characters of Archi and Baha.

See also
 Ichche Nodee
 Kusum Dola
 Jol Nupur

References

External links
 
 Ishti Kutum at Facebook

Bengali-language television programming in India
Indian television series
Indian television soap operas
2011 Indian television series debuts
2015 Indian television series endings
Star Jalsha original programming